The Medak–Akkannapet section is an operational railway line of the Indian Railways. The section falls under the jurisdiction of Hyderabad of South Central Railway zone.

The project 

The project was sanctioned in the year 2012–13. The foundation was laid on 19 January 2014 at Medak by Vijayashanthi (MP).

References

Rail transport in Telangana
Hyderabad railway division
5 ft 6 in gauge railways in India
Proposed railway lines in India
Proposed infrastructure in Telangana
Medak district